Bəyqışlaq (also, Bekkyshlak and Beykyshlakh) is a village in the Khachmaz Rayon of Azerbaijan.  The village forms part of the municipality of Canaxır.

References

Populated places in Khachmaz District